Brocēni Station is a railway station in Brocēni on the Jelgava – Liepāja Railway.

References 

Railway stations in Latvia
Railway stations opened in 1927
Saldus Municipality
Courland